Fatmir Toçi (born 24 April 1958, in Tirana) is an Albanian writer and publisher who currently serves as the president of "Toena" Publishing House. He is also the president of the Association of Albanian Publishers.

References

Albanian writers
20th-century Albanian writers
21st-century Albanian writers
Albanian publishers (people)
1958 births
Living people
People from Tirana